Psectrotarsia suavis is a species of moth of the family Noctuidae. It is found from south-western South Dakota, extreme north-eastern and western Nebraska, northern and south-western Kansas, eastern Colorado, New Mexico east of the Rocky Mountains, southern Arizona, and the panhandles of Oklahoma and Texas and in south central and south-western Texas. There are two records from Mexico, one from Chihuahua and one from San Luis Potosi.

The wingspan is 32–34 mm.

External links
 Species info Revision of the Genus Psectrotarsia Dognin, 1907 (Lepidoptera: Noctuidae: Heliothinae)
 Images

Heliothinae